Kardiakafti is a village in the northwestern part of the municipal unit of Gastouni in Elis, Greece. It is situated in a flat rural area, on the right bank of the river Pineios. It is 2 km west of Kavasila, 2 km southeast of Dimitra, 3 km northwest of Gastouni and 3 km northeast of Vartholomio.

Population

External links
GTP - Kardiakafti

See also

List of settlements in Elis

References

Gastouni
Populated places in Elis